Agriophara gravis is a moth of the family Depressariidae. It is found in Australia, where it has been recorded from New South Wales and Tasmania.

The wingspan is 26–27 mm. The forewings are fuscous-grey, densely irrorated with white and with some short streaks of blackish scales on the veins in the disc and towards the hindmargin, the latter forming a strongly curved transverse series. There is a blackish dot in the disc before two-thirds and a dark fuscous suffused spot immediately beyond this, and a smaller one on the middle of the hindmargin, nearly confluent. The hindwings are fuscous-grey, lighter anteriorly.

References

Moths described in 1890
Agriophara
Moths of Australia